Floyd Orson Wolfenbarger (1904–1979), was an American architect in Kansas. He founded the architectural firm F. O. Wolfenbarger and Associates in 1935, and was part of the architectural firm partnership, Wolfenbarger and McCulley. Wolfenbarger designed several Kansas State University buildings in Manhattan, Kansas.

Biography 
Floyd Orson Wolfenbarger was born on November 29, 1904 in Winkler, an unincorporated community in Riley County, Kansas. He graduated from Manhattan High School.

He graduated from Kansas State Agricultural College (now Kansas State University) in Manhattan, Kansas in 1927. He received a Bemis Foundation grant for work at Massachusetts Institute of Technology (MIT), to develop modular units as building materials.

He lived in Boston, Massachusetts for 8 years, working at the architecture firm Bigelow, Wadsworth, Hubbard and Smith. In 1934 or 1935, he returned to Manhattan, Kansas to open his own architectural firm F. O. Wolfenbarger and Associates, where he designed hospitals, jails, recreational facilities, businesses and homes. He also worked for the Riley County Better Housing Committee. In 1956, he served on the design team for the Dwight D. Eisenhower Presidential Library in Abilene, Kansas. Wolfenbarger served as president of the Kansas chapter of the American Institute of Architects (AIA) in 1949.  

He established an architectural firm Wolfenbarger and McCulley in the city of Manhattan, Kansas, a partnership with architect Robert Maxwell McCulley, who continued the firm until 1985, after Wolfenbarger's death.   

He died on July 18, 1979 in Topeka, Kansas, after a stay in a hospital. The Kansas Historical Society has a collection of the firm's records.

Work

Mattie M. Elliot House (c. 1927, or 1928), at 600 Houston Street, Manhattan, Riley County, Kansas; NRHP-listed
Nelson Antrim Crawford House (1938), at 2202 SW Seventeenth Street, Topeka, Shawnee County, Kansas; NRHP-listed
Riley County Jail (1940), at Colorado and 6th Streets, Manhattan, Kansas
Riley County Memorial Hospital (1954), at Manhattan, Kansas
Eisenhower Presidential Library (1956) in Abilene, Kansas; one of the project architects
Kansas State University, several buildings including McCain Auditorium (1969), King Hall (1966), Caldwell Hall (1963), and Justin Hall (1960)
Manhattan Country Club, at Manhattan, Kansas
AT&T building at 1640 Fairchild Avenue, Manhattan, Kansas
Arthur-Green office building at 801 Poyntz Avenue, Manhattan, Kansas
Riley County Historical Museum at 2309 Claflin Road, Manhattan, Kansas
Lee Elementary at 701 Lee Street, Manhattan, Kansas

See also 

 National Register of Historic Places listings in Riley County, Kansas

References

1904 births
1979 deaths
20th-century American architects
Architects from Kansas
Kansas State University alumni
People from Riley County, Kansas